Henny Schermann (19 February 1912 – 30 May 1942) was a Jewish lesbian from Germany, who was murdered in Bernburg Euthanasia Centre.

Biography 
Henny Schermann was born on 19 February 1912 in Frankfurt. She was the first of three children to a Jewish couple; her father was a Russian immigrant, but her mother was German. Her parents separated in 1931 and her mother, Selma, took over the running of the family shoe shop at Meisengasse 6; the shop was later forced to close due to anti-Semitic boycotts.

After the seizure of power by the Nazi Party in 1933, all Jewish women were forced, by decree, to add Sara as a middle name, which was intended as a defamatory mark of belonging to the alleged Jewish "race". Despite this, Schermann, who worked as an assistant in a shop, refused to use the middle name. She continued to visit lesbian bars in Frankfurt, behaviour which was dangerous since homosexuality was illegal in Nazi Germany.

In March 1940, Schermann was arrested and interned in the Ravensbrück concentration camp for women, where, on the back of her photo, the doctor and specialist in eugenics, Friedrich Mennecke (de), wrote:“Jenny Sara Schermann, born February 19, 1912 in Frankfurt am Main. Single saleswoman in Frankfurt am Main. Licentious lesbian, only frequents [homosexual] bars. Refused the first name 'Sara'. Stateless Jew.”Mennecke was also the doctor assigned to Mary Pünjer, who was accused of lesbianism. After two years in the concentration camp, Schermann was sent to the Bernburg Euthanasia Centre, near Magdeburg, which specialised in the elimination of "asocial" elements from society. She was murdered in a gas chamber there on 30 May 1942.

Shermann's mother Selma and her sister Regina were deported in the first convoy to leave Frankfurt on 19 October 1941. They were murdered in Lodz. Her brother, Herbert, tried to escape but was arrested in France and deported to Auschwitz. The dates of their murders are unknown.

Legacy 
Schermann's life is commemorated with a Stolperstein at the address of her family's shoe shop in Frankfurt. As one of the few lesbian women whose persecution by the Nazi state is documented, there has been an increased interest in her life as historians record and examine the persecution of LGBT communities during the Second World War.

Schermann was undoubtedly murdered because she was Jewish. However, Mennecke's comment on her passport photo demonstrates a direct interest in and condemnation of her sexuality by a leading doctor of eugenics at the Ravensbrück camp. Her dispatch to the Bernburg Euthanasia Facility, shows how the authorities continued a targeted persecution of homosexual women, who were guilty, according to Nazi ideology, of lowering the Reich's birth rate and weakening the "master race".

See also 

 Elsa Conrad

References 

1912 births
1942 deaths
Persecution of homosexuals in Nazi Germany
People from Frankfurt
Ravensbrück concentration camp prisoners
German people who died in Nazi concentration camps
German Jews who died in the Holocaust
German people of Russian-Jewish descent
Lesbian Jews
People murdered at the Bernburg Euthanasia Centre
20th-century German LGBT people